Pedrito Sierra  (born ) is a Puerto Rican male volleyball player. He was part of the Puerto Rico men's national volleyball team at the 2014 FIVB Volleyball Men's World Championship in Poland. He played for Cariduros de Fajardo.

Clubs
 Cariduros de Fajardo (2014)

References

1989 births
Living people
Puerto Rican men's volleyball players
Place of birth missing (living people)